Troy Edwin Nehls (born April 7, 1968) is an American politician and former law enforcement officer who is the U.S. representative for Texas's 22nd congressional district. From 2013 to 2021, he served as the sheriff for Fort Bend County, Texas. Nehls is a member of the Republican Party.

Early life and education
Nehls was born in Beaver Dam, Wisconsin. His father, Edwin Nehls, served in the Korean War and as sheriff of Dodge County, Wisconsin. Nehls enlisted in the United States Army Reserve in 1988. He served tours of duty in Bosnia, Iraq, and Afghanistan, and earned two Bronze Stars. He earned his bachelor's degree from Liberty University and a master's degree in criminal justice from University of Houston–Downtown.

Career
Nehls moved to Fort Bend County, Texas, in 1994, and joined the police department of Richmond, Texas. In 1998, he was fired for reasons including destruction of evidence.

In 2004, Nehls was elected constable for Fort Bend County, while he was serving in Iraq. He retired from the Army Reserve with the rank of major in 2009. In 2012, Nehls was elected sheriff of Fort Bend County, taking office in January 2013. He was reelected in 2016.

In July 2019, he announced that he would not seek reelection as sheriff in 2020.

As a US Army reservist, Nehls was awarded the Combat Infantryman Badge (CIB) for combat actions.

U.S. House of Representatives

Elections

2020 

In mid-July 2019, Nehls created a website where he asked Fort Bend County residents whether he should run for Congress in the 22nd congressional district, which covers Katy, Sugar Land, and Pearland. On July 25, 2019, Olson announced he would not seek reelection in 2020. In December 2019, Nehls announced that he would run for the seat.

Nehls finished first in the March Republican primary with 40.5% of the vote. In the July runoff, he defeated second-place finisher Kathaleen Wall with 70% of the vote. He faced Democratic nominee Sri Preston Kulkarni in the general election in November.

According to his campaign website, Nehls ran in order to improve mental and physical health care for veterans and to protect oil and gas jobs in Texas. Two days after he became the nominee, the "Standing with President Trump" page on that website was removed.

In the general election, Nehls defeated Kulkarni, 52% to 45%. He assumed office on January 3, 2021.

117th Congress
In his first week in the U.S. House, Nehls and other members of Congress were seen assisting U.S. Capitol Police in barricading the door to the House floor from protesters during the 2021 United States Capitol attack.

On January 7, 2021, Nehls joined 121 other Republican members of Congress in objecting to counting certain electoral votes in the 2020 presidential election. On January 13, 2021, he voted against the second impeachment of President Donald Trump.

After President Joe Biden delivered a speech to a joint session of Congress in April 2021, Nehls approached Biden and said he wanted to work together on criminal justice reform. Biden administration staff subsequently reached out to Nehls's office. On May 25, 2021, Nehls partnered with Representative Val Demings to introduce H.R. 3529, The Second Chance Opportunity for Re-Entry Education (SCORE) Act, to direct grant funds to county jails for career training programs for non-violent, incarcerated individuals to reduce jail recidivism.

On January 3, 2022, Nehls entered a full transcript of an interview on The Joe Rogan Experience with Robert W. Malone into the Congressional Record in order to circumvent what he said was censorship by social media. 

In the wake of the FBI search of presidential records at Mar-a-Lago in 2022, Nehls announced his support for Donald Trump for president in 2024 and denounced the FBI and Department of Justice as "corrupt".

in 2022, Nehls published his book The Big Fraud, in which he comments on the 2020 presidential election.

Nehls's bill, H.R. 6064, passed the House by a vote of 414-2 and was signed into law by President Joe Biden on December 27, 2022. H.R. 6064 directs the VA and National Academies of Science and Medicine to review VA examinations that are provided for mental and physical conditions linked to military sexual trauma and assess the impairments of individuals arising from such trauma.

Committee assignments
U.S. House Committee on Transportation & Infrastructure
Subcommittee on Railroads, Pipelines, and Hazardous Materials (Chairman)
Subcommittee on Highways and Transit
Subcommittee on Aviation
United States House Committee on the Judiciary
Committee on the January 6 Attack (retracted by Kevin McCarthy)

Caucus memberships
Republican Study Committee
Freedom Caucus
Western Caucus
Border Security Caucus
Bipartisan Taskforce for Combating Antisemitism
General Aviation Caucus

Political Positions

Syria
In 2023, Nehls was among 47 Republicans to vote in favor of H.Con.Res. 21 which directed President Joe Biden to remove U.S. troops from Syria within 180 days.

Electoral history

Personal life 
Nehls has a twin brother, Trever. Trever Nehls served in the Army Reserve for 24 years, including tours in Iraq and Afghanistan. Another brother, Todd, served in the Wisconsin Army National Guard and is a former sheriff of Dodge County. Trever succeeded Troy as a constable for Fort Bend County in 2013, and won the Republican nomination to succeed him as the sheriff of Fort Bend County in March 2020.

Nehls and his wife, Jill, an educator, have three daughters.

References

External links
Representative Troy Nehls official U.S. House website
Campaign website

|-

1968 births
Living people
American law enforcement officials
Liberty University alumni
Military personnel from Wisconsin
People from Fort Bend County, Texas
Politicians from Beaver Dam, Wisconsin
Republican Party members of the United States House of Representatives from Texas
Texas sheriffs
University of Houston–Downtown alumni
United States Army officers
United States Army reservists